A patriot is a person with the quality of patriotism.

Patriot(s) or The Patriot(s) may also refer to:

Political and military groups

United States
 Patriot (American Revolution), those who supported the cause of independence in the American Revolution
 Patriot movement, a small-government or anti-government conservative movement in the United States
 Christian Patriot movement, a far-right conservative movement in the United States

Elsewhere
 Patriot Party (disambiguation), various parties
 Patriotten, a Dutch political faction in the 18th century
 Arbegnoch (lit. patriots), Ethiopian resistance fighters, 1939–1941
 Patriot Governments (Spanish American independence), those who supported independence in South America, 1808–1833
 The Patriots (France), a French eurosceptic political party
 Patriote movement, a political movement in Québec, Canada, during the 19th century
 Hunter Patriots, in the Canadian Rebellions of 1836–1841
 Patriotic Union of Kurdistan, a political party in Kurdistan

Arts and media

Film and television
 The Patriot (1928 film), biographical film about Paul I of Russia
 The Patriots, a 1933 Boris Barnet film known as Okraina in Russia
 Patriots (1937 film), German film
 The Patriot (1938 film), French historical drama film
 The Patriot (1953 film), Iranian drama film
 The Patriots (TV series), 1962 Australian miniseries
 The Patriot (1986 film), action film directed by Frank Harris
 Patriots (1994 film), American film by Frank Kerr
 The Patriots (film), 1994 French film that starred Yvan Attal
 The Patriot (1998 film), Steven Seagal action film
 The Patriot (2000 film), film that stars Mel Gibson and Heath Ledger
 The Patriot (soundtrack)
 Patriot (TV series), a 2015 Amazon TV series

Newspapers 
 California Patriot, a conservative student magazine of the University of California, Berkeley
 The Lebanon Patriot, now defunct, published weekly in Lebanon, Ohio
 The Patriot Ledger, covering the south shore of Massachusetts
 The Patriot-News,  serving the Harrisburg, Pennsylvania area

Other media
 The Patriot (play), a 1702 play by Charles Gildon
 The Patriot, a 1939 novel by Pearl S. Buck
 The Patriots (play), a 1943 play by Sidney Kingsley
 Patriot (comics), comic book characters
 Patriot (video game), a 1993 strategy game about the Gulf War
 Patriots (novel series), by James Wesley Rawles
 Patriot (Johnny Cash album), 1991 compilation
 Patriot (Tublatanka album), 2010 album
 Sirius XM Patriot, a conservative satellite radio network

Companies
 Patriot Coal, a coal-mining company based in St. Louis, Missouri
 Patriot Memory, a Silicon Valley memory and computer accessory manufacturer
 Patriot Rail Company, an American short line railroad company

Places

 Patriot, Indiana, a town in the United States
 Patriot, Ohio, a town in the United States
 Patriot Place, a shopping and entertainment center next to Gillette Stadium in Foxborough, Mass

Sports 
 The Patriot (wrestler) (1961–2021), ring name of American pro Del Wilkes
 Tom Brandi (born 1966), second professional wrestler to use the ring name "The Patriot"
 The Patriots, a professional wrestling tag team consisting of Firebreaker Chip and Todd Champion

Teams
 El Paso Patriots, a soccer team (USL Premier Development League), based in Texas
 Fayetteville Patriots, in the National Basketball Development League, based in North Carolina
 George Mason Patriots, in various sports, from George Mason University in Virginia
 Indonesia Patriots, nickname for the country's national basketball team
 New England Patriots, American football, in the National Football League and based in Massachusetts
 Ozark Patriots, a baseball team based in Alabama
 Somerset Patriots, a minor league baseball team based in Bridgewater, New Jersey
 Patriots Jet Team, a civilian aerobatic formation team in the United States
 Patriotas F.C., a soccer team of the Categoría Primera A, based in Colombia
 Patriot Candrabhaga F.C., an Indonesian football club based in Bekasi, West Java

Other uses in sport
 Patriot League, a college athletic conference in northeastern United States
 Patriot Stadium, a soccer stadium in El Paso, Texas
 Patriot Stadium (Indonesia), a soccer stadium in Bekasi, Indonesia

Vehicles
 Patriot (fireboat), a fireboat operated by Tampa, Florida
 USS Patriot (MCM-7), a U.S. Navy mine countermeasures ship launched in 1990
 LMS Patriot Class, a class of express passenger steam locomotive
 Jeep Patriot, a compact SUV manufactured by FiatChrysler
 UAZ Patriot, a mid-sized SUV manufactured by UAZ

Other uses 
 MIM-104 Patriot, a surface-to-air missile system 
 Patriot (Worlds of Fun), a roller coaster in Worlds of Fun amusement park
 Patriot (California's Great America), a floorless roller coaster

See also
 Patriotism (disambiguation)
 Patriot Games (disambiguation)